Legia Warsaw II, in Poland known as Legia II Warszawa, is a Polish football team, which serves as the reserve side of Legia Warsaw. They compete in the III liga, the fourth division of Polish football, and play their home matches at the Legia Training Center in Książenice, Grodzisk Mazowiecki Commune, Masovian Voivodeship.

History 
The team was established in the 1920s. After the World War II, the club resumed its activity. In 1952, the club surprisingly reached the final of the Polish Cup, previously eliminating Lechia Zielona Góra II (6–2), Naprzód Lipiny (2–1), ŁKS Łódź (7–1), Górnik Zabrze (2–1), Ruch Chorzów (2–1) and Wisła Kraków (0–0, 1–0). In the final Legia II lost 0–1 to Polonia Warsaw.

At the beginning of the 21st century, Legia Warsaw II played between the III and IV liga. After the 2006–07 season, the reserve team was withdrawn from the league, giving way to the Młoda Ekstraklasa team, which had its own separate competition. In 2013, after the elimination of this competition, Legia II returned to III liga.

Despite the existence of the Młoda Ekstraklasa, Legia's reserves continued to compete in the Polish Cup at the regional level. In the 2007–08 season, Legia II reached the final of these games, losing 0–1 to Hutnik Warsaw. However, thanks to the participation in the finals, the reserve team got the right to start in the competition at the central level in the next season, where it ended its adventure in the first round. In the 2011/2012 season, the reserves of the Warsaw club managed to win the Polish Cup at the provincial level, defeating Broń Radom 2–1 in the final. In the next season, they started again in the central level competitions, also reaching the first round.

In the 2019–20 season, Legia II reached the 1/8 finals of the Polish Cup (previously eliminating higher-ranked teams of Wigry Suwałki and Odra Opole), where they were defeated by Piast Gliwice (0–2). All the games were held at the Ząbki City Stadium (then the home for Legia II games).

Stadium 
Legia II play their games at the Legia Training Center in Książenice, Grodzisk Mazowiecki Commune, Masovian Voivodeship. In 2020 they played their home games at the Grodzisk Mazowiecki City Stadium, and in 2016–2020 at the Ząbki City Stadium.

Honours 
Polish Cup
 Runners-up: 1952

Notable former players 
Players who have been capped in their national teams
  Paweł Golański
  Michał Karbownik
  Robert Lewandowski
  Dominik Nagy
  Ivan Obradović
  Hildeberto Pereira
  Chris Philipps
  Sebastian Szymański
  Jasurbek Yakhshiboev

References

External links 
 Legia Warsaw II at 90minut.pl 
 List of reserve team players at Legia.com 

Legia Warsaw
Reserve team football in Poland